Mike Burke (born June 14, 1974) is an American professional strongman competitor from Aurora, Colorado. Mike won the 2012 All-American Strongman Challenge in January 2012. This victory qualified him for the 2012 Arnold Strongman Classic and he finished in 5th place.

Burke placed third at the Giants Live event in Melbourne, Australia on March 17, 2012. This placing qualified Burke for the 2012 World's Strongest Man contest, however, he failed to make the finals.

Just one day after the 2012 World's Strongest Man contest, Burke competed in the 2012 America's Strongest Man contest and took first place.

Burke competed in the 2013 World's Strongest Man in Sanya, China and qualified for the finals where he finished in 5th place.

Burke finished second at the Strongman Champions League contest in Russia on September 16, 2013.

Burke also officially closed the Captains of Crush No. 3.5 (146 kg / 322.5 lb) gripper in 2013

Burke competed in the 2014 World's Strongest Man at the Commerce Casino in Los Angeles, California. Burke qualified for the finals where he finished 4th his best performance in World's Strongest Man. In 2015 World's Strongest Man he emerged 5th place.

References

American strength athletes
1974 births
Living people